The Jenny Wiley Stakes is a Grade I American Thoroughbred horse race for fillies and Mares, age four and older over a distance of one and one-sixteenth miles on the turf held annually in early April at Keeneland Race Course, Lexington, Kentucky during the spring meeting.

History

The Jenny Wiley Stakes is named for Jenny Wiley, a pregnant pioneer woman captured in Kentucky by Native Americans in 1789 and who escaped after almost a year in captivity.

The event was inaugurated on 17 April 1989 and was won by Native Mommy, ridden by Craig Perret to a  length margin in a time of 1:43 over the  miles distance.

The event in 1995 was upgraded to Grade III. It was upgrade to Grade II and to the elite status of Grade I in 2012.

The quality of runners has improved to reflect the classification of the event. Dual winner British bred Intercontinental trained by Hall of Fame trainer Robert J. Frankel won this race in 2005. The mare later that year won the Breeders' Cup Filly & Mare Turf at Belmont Park and was awarded US Champion Female Turf Horse. Also the US Champion Female Turf Horse of 2015, Tepin won this event as a short priced favorite in 2016 after winning the Breeders' Cup Filly & Mare Turf in 2015.

The Jenny Wiley Stakes was sponsored by Coolmore America Ashford Stud since 2016 until 2021 which was reflected in the name of the event.

Records
Speed  record: 
 miles:  1:39.02  – Rushing Fall (2020)

Margins
5 lengths –  Tepin (2016)

Most wins
 2 – Rushing Fall (2019, 2020)
 2 – Intercontinental (GB) (2004, 2005)

Most wins by an owner
 4 – Juddmonte Farms (2002, 2004, 2005, 2021)

Most wins by a jockey
 5 – Jerry D. Bailey (1996, 1999, 2003, 2004, 2005)

Most wins by a trainer
 5 – Chad C. Brown (2015, 2018, 2019, 2020, 2022)

Winners

Legend:

See also 
 List of American and Canadian Graded races

References

Graded stakes races in the United States
Grade 1 stakes races in the United States
Flat horse races for four-year-old fillies
Turf races in the United States
Mile category horse races for fillies and mares
Recurring sporting events established in 1989
Keeneland horse races
1989 establishments in Kentucky